Jonathan Moss Tucker (born May 31, 1982) is an American actor. He is known for his roles in the films The Virgin Suicides (1999), The Texas Chainsaw Massacre (2003), Hostage (2005), In the Valley of Elah (2007), The Ruins (2008), and Charlie's Angels (2019). He has appeared in the television series The Black Donnellys (2007), Parenthood (2011–2013), Kingdom (2014–2017), Justified (2015), Snowfall (2018), Westworld (2018-2022), City on a Hill (2019), and Debris (2021).

Early life
Tucker was born in Boston, Massachusetts, to parents Maggie Moss, a public relations and marketing analyst and executive, and Paul Hayes Tucker, a professor of art at the University of Massachusetts Boston and a leading expert on Claude Monet. His paternal great-grandfather was historian and ambassador Carlton J. H. Hayes. His aunt and uncle, Mary Evelyn Tucker and John Grim, founded and co-direct the Yale Forum on Religion and Ecology.

His father is Irish Catholic and his mother is Jewish and of Romanian Jewish descent.

Tucker was raised in Charlestown, Massachusetts, and attended The Park School in Brookline, Massachusetts. He attended the Boston Ballet and played Fritz in their production of The Nutcracker for 5 years starting when he was in the third grade. He was featured in a Boston Ballet calendar and attended The Thacher School in Ojai, California. Tucker said of his ballet experience, "Ballet is one of the more difficult rigors that I've ever done. The Ballet instructors are some of the most intimidating people I've met."

Career
Tucker first started off in film by appearing in the early 1990s films Botte di Natale (1994), Two If by Sea (1996) and Sleepers (1996) before being cast in the 1999 film The Virgin Suicides as Tim Weiner.

He starred as Matthew in the 2000 comedy film 100 Girls. A year later, he co-starred in Sundance hit The Deep End with Tilda Swinton and Josh Lucas. In 2003, Tucker was cast in the much anticipated re-imagining of the 1974 horror film of the same name, The Texas Chainsaw Massacre produced by Michael Bay and directed by Marcus Nispel. In 2004, he appeared in the films Stateside and Criminal.

In the 2005 film Hostage, Tucker worked alongside Bruce Willis and Ben Foster. Tucker plays Dennis Cooper, one of the brothers that, along with their mysterious accomplice Mars, holds a family hostage. Tucker was directed by Paul Haggis twice in 2007: he starred as Tommy Lee Jones's son in the film In the Valley of Elah as a soldier who is permanently changed by war after returning from Iraq; he also played Tommy Donnelly in the NBC TV series The Black Donnellys.

In 2008, he was cast in The Ruins, a thriller based on the best selling book by Scott Smith and directed by Sundance award-winner Carter Smith.

He portrayed emerging artist Patrick Angus in the 2009 film An Englishman in New York, opposite John Hurt as Quentin Crisp. The biographical drama chronicles Crisp's later years spent in New York City. He then appeared in the 2010 film The Next Three Days with Russell Crowe and Elizabeth Banks, marking his third collaboration with Haggis.

It was announced in November 2011 that Tucker had signed on to the TV series Parenthood. He played the role of Mayor Bob Little from 2011 to 2014.

Tucker had a main role on the 2014 DirecTV drama series Kingdom. He played Jay, a mixed martial artist and son of trainer, Alvey Kulina, for which he was nominated for Best Supporting Actor by Entertainment Weekly, which described his work as "one of the most electric performances on television."

In 2015, Tucker also appeared in the final five episodes of the TV series Justified on FX as the crazy-eyed Boon — a cross between Billy the Kid and Travis Bickle.

Continuing his collaboration with Bryan Fuller, having appeared in the second season of Hannibal, Tucker starred as Low-Key Lyesmith in Starz's American Gods, adapted from Neil Gaiman's 2001 novel.

Tucker co-wrote the song "Champagne Problems" on Nick Jonas' 2016 album Last Year Was Complicated.

Beginning in 2019, Tucker played Frankie Ryan, a Boston gangster, in the Showtime crime drama City on a Hill.

In 2021, Tucker played the lead role of CIA operative Bryan Beneventi in the short-lived NBC science fiction series Debris.

Personal life
On June 16, 2012, Tucker married Tara Ahamed, daughter of Pulitzer Prize-winning economic historian Liaquat Ahamed. They have a twin son and daughter born May 15, 2019.

Tucker practices Transcendental Meditation to offset loneliness on film locations. He is the founder of the nonprofit organization Pegasus Fund.

Filmography

Film

Television

Video games

References

External links

1982 births
Living people
American male ballet dancers
American male child actors
American male film actors
American male television actors
American people of Irish descent
American people of Romanian-Jewish descent
Jewish American male actors
Male actors from Boston
20th-century American male actors
21st-century American male actors
The Thacher School alumni
21st-century American Jews